J. Michael "Mike" Diaz is a judge of Division I of the Washington State Court of Appeals in Seattle and an adjunct professor of law at Seattle University School of Law, where he has taught a civil rights course and supervised Independent Studies students and externs.

Early life and education

Diaz immigrated from Peru to Seattle as an infant. His family settled eventually in the then-working-class neighborhood of Ballard and, in middle school, moved down to the White Center/Burien area. His family spoke Spanish exclusively at home. He was the first lawyer in his large Latino family.

In 1996, Diaz received his Bachelor of Arts (BA) degree in Philosophy, magna cum laude, from the University of Notre Dame. He then was a graduate student at Princeton University, studying classical philosophy for two years. Diaz received his Juris Doctor degree (JD) from Cornell Law School in 2002, where he was a member of the Cornell International Law Journal.

Career and awards

From 2002 to 2006, Diaz was an associate in the Houston office of the international law firm of Fulbright & Jaworski LLP, litigating complex commercial and white-collar criminal matters. Diaz then returned home and joined the litigation boutique Yarmuth Wilsdon Calfo, litigating the same types of cases.

Diaz was an Assistant United States Attorney of the United States Attorney's Office for the Western District of Washington (“DOJ”) from 2008 to 2018, where he founded the office’s Civil Rights Program in 2011. In that capacity, he investigated and/or prosecuted a wide variety of civil rights matters, from “classic” civil rights cases such as housing, employment and educational matters to more “modern” matters, such as disability rights, servicemembers rights, and rights violated by police misconduct. He was the lead line attorney on the United States v. City of Seattle (Seattle PD) consent decree matter from its inception in 2010 until the SPD was found in full and effective compliance in 2018.

Among the honors Diaz received while at Department of Justice was the EOUSA Director's Award for “extraordinary professional achievements and excellence” in 2014, among the highest awards given to the nationwide United States Attorney community.  In 2012, he received the Thomas C. Wales Performance Award, the highest award given at the Seattle U.S. Attorney's Office, and the Assistant Attorney General for Civil Rights Division's Distinguished Service Award, also among the highest awards in that division.

Diaz was on faculty regularly between 2012 and 2017 at the DOJ's National Advocacy (Training) Center, lecturing on civil rights enforcement. Additionally, in 2016, Diaz lectured on the Rule of Law as part of the DOJ and State Department’s Office of Oversees Prosecutorial Training and Development in East Timor.

Expired nomination to district court 
In 2016 President Obama nominated Diaz to be a U.S. District Court Judge for the U.S District Court for the Western District of Washington. President Obama commented on the nomination stating, "I am honored to put forward [this] highly qualified candidate for the federal bench.... [He] will be a distinguished public servant and valuable addition to the United States District Court." The American Bar Association unanimously rated Diaz "Qualified" for the nomination. The nomination expired at the end of the 114th Congress without Senate action.

State judicial service 
Governor Jay Inslee appointed Diaz to the King County Superior Court in December 2017, effective January 22, 2018.  At the time of appointment, Governor Inslee stated "Michael's commitment to civil rights through his outstanding legal career and community involvement will make him an excellent addition to the bench. His unique experiences have prepared him to understand some of the challenges facing individuals in the courtroom."

As a King County Superior Court Judge, Diaz presided over approximately four dozen trial in all types of criminal, civil and domestic matters.  He also served a term as the Chief Judge of King County's Patricia H. Clark Children & Family Justice Center, and served on the Court's Executive, Budget, Rules and History committees.

Governor Inslee appointed Diaz to Division I of the Washington State Court of Appeals, effective September 2022. At the time of appointment, Governor Inslee stated “Over the last four years Judge Diaz has excelled on the trial bench. He has earned a reputation as a talented, respected, hard-working trial judge, and he will make a fantastic addition to our appellate bench.”

Community involvement 
As an attorney, Diaz regularly volunteered at the King County Bar Association's Neighborhood Legal Clinic Program's Spanish Language Legal Clinic, which he later helped merge with the El Centro de La Raza clinic. He served on KCBA's Pro Bono Service Committee, was Chair of its Neighborhood Legal Clinic Program's Advisory Committee, and Chair of its Spanish Clinic Subcommittee.

Diaz is on faculty at the DOJ’s National Advocacy Center, the Washington State Judicial Institute, and the Washington State Judicial College. He is currently the chairperson of the Washington State Supreme Court’s Interpreter Commission. For many years Diaz has helped coach/manage his daughters' school soccer team.

References

1974 births
Living people
Assistant United States Attorneys
Cornell Law School alumni
Hispanic and Latino American judges
People from Lima Province
Superior court judges in the United States
Texas lawyers
Notre Dame College of Arts and Letters alumni
Washington (state) lawyers
Washington (state) state court judges